Dean Raymond Cundey, A.S.C. (born March 12, 1946) is an American cinematographer and film director. He is known for his collaborations with John Carpenter, Steven Spielberg, Robert Zemeckis, as well as his extensive work in the horror genre, in addition to numerous family and comedy films. He was nominated for an Academy Award for Best Cinematography for his work on Who Framed Roger Rabbit and has been nominated for numerous BAFTAs and BSC Awards.

Life and career
Cundey was born in Alhambra, California, United States. As a child, he used to build model sets, suggesting an interest in films from an early age. Cundey already had several low-budget films when he met Debra Hill, who in 1978 recruited him to work on Halloween, a film she co-wrote with director John Carpenter.

Having Cundey work on a film brought considerable advantages. In addition to his considerable skill as a cinematographer and director of photography, he also had the advantage of owning most of his own equipment packed in a large van, referred to by Debra Hill as the "movie van".

Cundey's work on Halloween is cited by many fans as being among his best as director of photography. In addition to his lighting skills, particularly in the famous hallway scene where the hidden face of Michael Myers is slowly revealed by way of a blue light next to the mask, he was among the first cinematographers to make use of a recent invention called the steadicam, or panaglide.

The panaglide allowed the camera operator to "wear" the camera and obtain shots that were previously deemed too difficult or even impossible. In Halloween, the panaglide was used as a point of view reference for Michael Myers, allowing the audience to see what he saw.

Other noteworthy films
Cundey would go on to work with Carpenter and Hill again on the films The Fog, Escape From New York, The Thing, Halloween II, and Halloween III: Season of the Witch. He would also return to work with Carpenter for the last time on the 1986 big budget science fiction/comedy adventure Big Trouble in Little China.  Cundey also served as Director of Photography on the 3D movie Honey, I Shrunk the Audience! which ran in five Walt Disney theme parks around the world.

Later work
In addition to his work with Carpenter, Cundey would go on to lend his talents for the films Psycho II, Who Framed Roger Rabbit, the Back to the Future trilogy, What Women Want, Apollo 13, Jurassic Park, Romancing the Stone, Road House, and Garfield: The Movie to name a few. In 1997, he made his directorial debut with the direct-to-video sequel Honey, We Shrunk Ourselves. He recently worked in Canada on Camp Rock, one of several movies that he has filmed outside the United States, including Who Framed Roger Rabbit which was filmed primarily in England. In 2011, Cundey shot the comedy film Jack and Jill, a film which involved extensive split-screen and motion control effects to create the illusion of actor Adam Sandler interacting with multiple on-screen personas.

Filmography

Film

Television
TV series

TV movies

Other credits

Awards and recognition
Cundey is a member of the American Society of Cinematographers. His work on Who Framed Roger Rabbit earned him an Academy Award nomination. On February 2, 2014, he was honored with a Lifetime Achievement Award by The ASC; John Carpenter introduced him.
 1988 Academy Award for Best Cinematography: Who Framed Roger Rabbit (nomination)
 1988 BSC Award for Best Cinematography: Who Framed Roger Rabbit (nomination)
 1991 ASC Award for Outstanding Cinematography in Theatrical Releases: Hook (nomination)
 1995 BAFTA Award for Best Cinematography: Apollo 13 (nomination)
 1995 BSC Award for Best Cinematography: Apollo 13 (nomination)
 1995 ASC Award for Outstanding Cinematography in Theatrical Releases: Apollo 13 (nomination)
 1995 Chicago Film Critics Association Award for Best Cinematography: Apollo 13 (nomination)
 1999 Society of Camera Operators President's Award (won)
 2002 Emmy Award for Outstanding Single Camera Photography: Religion & Ethics Newsweekly: The Face: Jesus in Art (won)
 2014 ASC Award Lifetime Achievement Award (won)

References

External links
 

1946 births
American cinematographers
Living people
People from Alhambra, California